The Löndö Association (AL) was a political party in the Central African Republic led by Henri Pouzère.

History
The party was established around 2004. In the 2005 general elections it won a single seat in the National Assembly.

References

2004 establishments in the Central African Republic
Defunct political parties in the Central African Republic
Political parties established in 2004
Political parties with year of disestablishment missing